Chacaíto is a Caracas Metro station on Line 1. It was opened on 27 March 1983 as the eastern terminus of the extension of Line 1 from La Hoyada. On 23 April 1988 the line was extended to Los Dos Caminos. The station is between Sabana Grande and Chacao.

References

Caracas Metro stations
1983 establishments in Venezuela
Railway stations opened in 1983